Sir Lambert Hepenstal Ormsby M.D., Uniy. Dub.; FRCS (19 July 1850 – 21 December 1923) was an Irish surgeon.

Selected publications

 Nature and treatment of Deformities of the human body. Dublin, 1875.
 Medical History of the Meath Hospital and County Dublin Infirmary &c. Dublin: Fannin & Co., Dublin, 1888.

References

External links
 
 

1850 births
1923 deaths
Irish knights
Irish surgeons
Knights Bachelor
Fellows of the Royal College of Surgeons